Written in Scars is the fourth studio album by English-Italian singer-songwriter Jack Savoretti. It was released on 9 February 2015 by BMG Chrysalis UK.

The album has peaked at number 7 on the UK Albums Chart and has sold 147,092 copies as of November 2016.

Reception 

The album was critically acclaimed, with reviews including 4 stars from The Independent and 4 stars from Q. BBC Radio 2 made Written in Scars their Album of the Week on 1 February 2015, and Tesco also made it their Album of the Week on 10 April 2015.

Track listing 
 "Back to Me" – written by Jack Savoretti and Samuel Dixon (3:18)
 "Home" – written by Jack Savoretti, Pedro Vito and Sebastian Sternberg (3:17)
 "Don't Mind Me" – written by Jack Savoretti and Samuel Dixon (3:27)
 "Tie Me Down" – written by Jack Savoretti and Matty Benbrook (3:01)
 "Broken Glass" – written by Jack Savoretti and Samuel Dixon (3:15)
 "The Other Side of Love" – written by Jack Savoretti and Samuel Dixon (4:14)
 "Nobody 'Cept You" – written by Bob Dylan (3:13)
 "The Hunger" – written by Jack Savoretti, Pedro Vito and Sebastian Sternberg (3:38)
 "Written in Scars" – written by Jack Savoretti and Samuel Dixon (3:57)
 "Wasted" (feat. Lissie) – written by Jack Savoretti and Matty Benbrook (2:57)
 "Fight 'Til the End" – written by Jack Savoretti, Pedro Vito and Sebastian Sternberg (3:34)

Additional tracks
The online release also contained three bonus tracks:
"Home" (acoustic; bonus track)
"The Other Side of Love" (acoustic; bonus track)
"Written in Scars" (acoustic; bonus track)

Written in Scars (New Edition)

After the success of the album, Savoretti released a lengthier 20-track edition on BMG Rights Management (UK) Ltd titled Written in Scars (New Edition). The first 11 tracks were identical and in same order as appearing in the original album.

The remaining nine tracks included two brand new songs, "Back Where I Belong" and "Catapult", five live renditions of tracks appearing in the original album including the title track. The remaining two new tracks are collaborations with Alexander Brown, first in a rendition of "Jack In a Box" as a duet with him, the second the track "The Other Side of Love" with a vocal remix of Alexander Brown.

Track listing
 "Back to Me" – 3:18
 "Home" – 3:17
 "Don't Mind Me" – 3:27
 "Tie Me Down" – 3:01
 "Broken Glass" – 3:15
 "The Other Side of Love" – 4:14
 "Nobody 'Cept You" – 3:13
 "The Hunger" – 3:38
 "Written in Scars" – 3:57
 "Wasted" – 2:57
 "Fight 'Til the End" – 3:34
 "Back Where I Belong" – written by Jack Savoretti & Matt Benbrook – 4:47
 "Catapult"- written by Jack Savoretti and Jon Green – 3:26
 "Written n Scars" (live in Rome) – 5:05
 "Back to Me" (live in Rome) – 3:29
 "Fight 'Til the End (live in Rome) – 4:08
 "Home" (live in Rome) – 3:33
 "Broken Glass" (live in Rome) – 4:02
 "Jack In a Box" (Alexander Brown version) – duet with Alexander Brown – written by Jack Savoretti & Matt Benbrook – 3:12
 "The Other Side of Love" (Alexander Brown vocal remix) – 3:55

Charts

Weekly charts

Year-end charts

References

2015 albums
Jack Savoretti albums
Albums produced by Samuel Dixon
Chrysalis Records albums